Senegal requires its residents to register their motor vehicles and display vehicle registration plates.

Regional Codes

References

Senegal
Transport in Senegal
Senegal transport-related lists